Nekrasovskoye is an urban locality (a work settlement) the administrative center of Nekrasovsky District in  Yaroslavl Oblast.

History
First mentioned in 1214 as the village of Sol Vilikaya in the fight Rostov Principality Konstantin and Vladimir - George for local salt sources. Later, the settlement was known as Bolshie Soli. In the 15th to 17th centuries mid saltworks worked here (at the end of the 16th century was Varnitsa). In subsequent years, more salt famous for their wood-carvers and masons.

On February 20, 1934 the Presidium of the Central Executive Committee decided to transfer the administrative center of the district of the village Bolshesolskogo Babaiki to the Nekrovskoye.

References

Urban-type settlements in Yaroslavl Oblast
Nekrasovsky District